Kir Joakim was a Serbian Orthodox monk, choirmaster (domestikos), and the oldest Serbian composer of liturgical melodies. He signed himself "sir Joakim, monk and domestikos of Serbia" (кир Јоаким, монах и доместик Србије). Older sources state he lived in the 15th century, while newer sources state that he lived in the 14th century (1360–85). Serbian-American musicologist Miloš Velimirović (1922–2008) made a study on him, Joakim monah i domestik Srbije (1964). The manuscript mentioning him with his titles was dated by Velimirović to before 1453. He lived at the Charsianitos Monastery in Constantinople. The Athens National Library has two Koinonika, a Theotokion, and three Vespers, in Greek, by Kir Joakim (as of 1969). Along with Isaiah the Serb, Kir Stefan the Serb and Nikola the Serb, he is part of medieval Serbian musical heritage, which is also part of Byzantine heritage. One of his works, Kratima Terirem (Κράτημα 'Τεριρέμ), was included in Dragoslav Aksentijević-Pavle's album Music of Old Serbia (1987).

See also
Kir Stefan the Serb
Nikola the Serb
Isaiah the Serb
John Koukouzelis
Lazar the Serb

References

Sources

Further reading

14th-century Serbian people
14th-century Christian monks
14th-century composers
15th-century Serbian people
15th-century Christian monks
15th-century composers
Serbian composers
Serbian monks
Christian hymnwriters
Medieval singers
Medieval male composers